Stardock Corporation is a software development company founded in 1991 and incorporated in 1993 as Stardock Systems. Stardock initially developed for the OS/2 platform, but was forced to switch to Microsoft Windows due to the collapse of the OS/2 software market between 1997 and 1998. The company is best known for computer programs that allow a user to modify or extend a graphical user interface as well as personal computer games, particularly strategy games such as the Galactic Civilizations series, Sins of a Solar Empire: Rebellion, Elemental: Fallen Enchantress, and Ashes of the Singularity.

Stardock created and maintains WinCustomize, a graphical user interface customization community, and developed the Impulse content delivery system before its sale to GameStop. Many of the skins and themes featured on its site are for software that is part of their Object Desktop windows desktop suite. They are based in Plymouth, Michigan.

History
Stardock was founded by college student Brad Wardell and named after a major city in Raymond E. Feist's Riftwar Cycle. Stardock began as a custom PC maker and expanded into making software.

OS/2 era (1993–2001)
Stardock's initial product was a computer game for OS/2 called Galactic Civilizations. Stardock did not receive the majority of royalties from the initial sales of Galactic Civilizations due to publisher bankruptcy in addition to taking on many of the publisher's responsibilities, but the market had been created for subsequent addon packs including the Shipyards expansion, and Stardock later sold a significant number of licenses to IBM for part of its Family FunPak (under the name Star Emperor). Stardock went on to create OS/2 Essentials, and its successor, Object Desktop, which provided the company with a large base of users.

At about this time, IBM decided to abandon OS/2. However, they did not make this decision public, and Stardock continued to develop applications software and games for the platform, including Avarice and Entrepreneur. With the advent of Windows NT 4, Stardock found that their core user base was slipping away, and was forced to reinvent itself as a Windows developer, but not before it lost most of its money and staff. A key revealing point was the failure of its game Trials of Battle, a 3D hovercraft fighting game, which Stardock expected to sell a million copies and instead sold in the hundreds.  Brad Wardell estimates that the death of OS/2 set the company back by about three years.

Windows era (1998–present)
The newer, smaller Stardock was heavily reliant on the goodwill of its previous customers, who essentially purchased Windows subscriptions for Object Desktop in anticipation of the products it would consist of. Having put together a basic package (including some old favorites from the OS/2 era) Stardock began to bring in external developers to create original products.

Stardock's first major Windows success was with WindowBlinds, an application originated by a partnership with developer Neil Banfield. There turned out to be a large market for skinnable products, and Stardock prospered, growing significantly in the following five years. The release of Windows XP stimulated sales in Stardock products, and despite growing competition proportional to the market the company remains in a strong position.

In 2001, they added a widget creation and desktop modification tool, DesktopX, based on Alberto Riccio's VDE. This has not had such a wide uptake as other products; some believe this is because it is harder to use and to create for, others because users do not understand the functionality that it offers. DesktopX competes with Konfabulator and Kapsules in the widget arena. In 2003, Stardock became a Microsoft Gold Certified Partner with their "Designed for Windows" certification of WindowBlinds.

Stardock's success in the Windows game market has been mixed. At first, its titles on Windows were published by third parties: The Corporate Machine (Take 2), Galactic Civilizations (Strategy First), and The Political Machine (Ubisoft). While all three titles sold well at retail, Stardock was unsatisfied with the amount of revenue Windows games developers received. In the case of Galactic Civilizations, publisher Strategy First filed for bankruptcy without paying most of the royalties it owed. This ultimately led to Stardock self-publishing its future titles. Because of the success of its desktop applications, Stardock has been able to self-fund its own PC games and aid third-party developers with their games as well.

In 2010 Q3, Stardock was forced into layoffs due to the unexpectedly poor launch of Elemental: War of Magic. In response to the disappointment of Elemental: War of Magic, Stardock committed to giving the second game of the series, Elemental: Fallen Enchantress to early adopters of War of Magic.

In 2012, Stardock successfully launched Sins of a Solar Empire: Rebellion to positive reviews. This version was co-developed by Stardock and development partner Ironclad Games.

In July 2013, Stardock bought the Star Control franchise from the Atari, SA bankruptcy proceedings and has plans to reboot the franchise. This resulted in the release of Star Control Origins, a prequel to the original Star Control game, which was released in September of 2018 to mixed reviews. Throughout development, the original creators of the Star Control license kept the game under tumultuous legal status.

Desktop enhancements and utilities
Stardock's Object Desktop is a set of PC desktop enhancement utilities designed to enable users to control the way their operating system looks, feels and functions. Originally developed for OS/2, the company released a version of it for Windows in 1999. Components of Object Desktop include WindowBlinds, IconPackager, DeskScapes, DesktopX, Fences and WindowFX, as well as utilities such as Multiplicity and SpaceMonger designed to increase productivity and stability on Windows.

Stardock also sells ObjectDock, which provides similar functionality to the dock found in Mac OS X, but with additional capabilities.

In 2012, Stardock added Start8 to Object Desktop, which adds a Start button and Start menu to Windows 8, whose lack of a traditional Start menu in favor of a Start screen received polarizing reception. A similar program, Start10, was created in 2015 to add a Start menu to Windows 10 that looks similar to Windows 7's Start Menu. Start10 was then followed by Start11, which aims to bring back Start menu and task bar functionality removed in Windows 11.

WinCustomize
Stardock owns and operates a number of community-centric websites, the most popular of which is WinCustomize. WinCustomize is best known for providing a library of downloadable content, such as skins, themes, icons and wallpapers for the Microsoft Windows operating systems.

Gameography
Stardock began operating as a game developer with their first title, Galactic Civilizations for the OS/2 platform in 1994. Stardock also published Stellar Frontier in 1995, a multiplayer space strategy/shooter game made by Doug Hendrix.

Stardock found success developing online software subscription services such as Object Desktop for the PC, which allowed them to slowly grow a separate game division. After the release of The Corporate Machine and Lightweight Ninja, Stardock remade Galactic Civilizations for the PC. A successful sequel was self-published by Stardock, allowing them to grow their publishing business for third-party games, including titles such as Sins of a Solar Empire, Demigod, and Ashes of the Singularity.

Digital distribution
Having developed Stardock Central to digitally distribute its own PC titles, the company launched a service called Drengin.net in summer 2003. The original idea was that users would pay a yearly subscription fee and receive new titles as they became available. Initially, Stardock's own titles along with titles from Strategy First were available. A year later, Stardock replaced the subscription model with a new system called TotalGaming.net in which users could purchase games individually or pay an upfront fee for tokens which allowed them to purchase games at a discount. TotalGaming.net targeted independent game developers rather than the larger publishers. In late 2008, new token purchases were discontinued.

In 2008, Stardock announced its third-generation digital distribution platform, Impulse. Stardock's intention was for Impulse to include independent third-party games and major publisher titles and indeed, the service now includes content from a variety of publishers. The platform was sold to GameStop in May 2011.

After the sale of Impulse to GameStop and the lack of success in major sales, Stardock's titles have started to appear on rival digital distribution services such as Steam.

ThinkDesk
ThinkDesk was a productivity application subscription service, launched by Stardock on 14 April 2005 as a utility counterpart to their Object Desktop and TotalGaming.net services. Subscriptions were for one year, after which users could choose to renew or keep the software that they have, including all released upgrades to that date. The service never came out of beta and was discontinued in March 2009.

ThinkDesk components were typically downloaded using Impulse, although if purchased separately they could also be downloaded as executable installers. They included:
 Multiplicity, which allows the control of multiple PCs with a single keyboard and mouse, in a similar manner to a KVM switch
 KeepSafe, which automatically kept file revisions for selected directories and file types
 ThinkSync, which synchronized files and folders between hard drives or across the Internet
 SecureProcess, which allowed only processes defined as safe to run; an anti-virus/anti-spyware component

Litigation
Stardock has been involved in litigation in relation to their business:

In 1998, they were sued by Entrepreneur magazine for use of the trademark name "Entrepreneur" for one of their games. Stardock claimed that their use of this word was not related to the magazine's business, but did not have the money to fight the case—the name was changed to Business Tycoon; a later version was rebranded as The Corporate Machine.
In December 2003, TGTSoft sued Stardock and Brad Wardell for declarative relief, claiming that they should be able to use the IconPackager  file format without charge. Many open source programs do read and write proprietary file formats without paying royalties—for example, OpenOffice.org reads and writes Word, Excel, PowerPoint and other Microsoft Office files. However, Stardock maintained that they should be entitled to royalties or a license fee on such software, particularly as TGTSoft was charging money for their products and because it was considered likely that their users would use the WinCustomize libraries, which are run with help (monetary and otherwise) from Stardock. The case was eventually settled out of court, with TGTSoft licensing the format for use with their products.
 In 2018, Stardock sued the Paul Reiche and Fred Ford in Stardock Systems, Inc. v. Reiche, for trademark infringement.  Reiche and Ford countersued for copyright infringement from Stardock continuing to sell Star Control I and II on Steam and GOG. Litigation ended in June 2019 when both sides reached a settlement in which Reiche and Ford agreed not use Star Control in relation to new titles and Stardock agreeing not to use an enumerated list of alien names from Star Control 1 and 2 in future games.  An unusual aspect of the resolution involved the parties negotiating directly without lawyers and exchanging honey for mead.

References

External links

 
1991 establishments in Michigan
Companies based in Wayne County, Michigan
American companies established in 1991
Video game companies established in 1991
Livonia, Michigan
Software companies based in Michigan
Video game companies of the United States
Video game development companies
Video game publishers
Privately held companies based in Michigan